Brooksville is an unincorporated community in Randolph County, in the U.S. state of Georgia.

History
The community was named after the Zuko. A variant name was "Zuksters". Georgia General Assembly incorporated the place as the "Town of Zukos" in 1870, with the town limits extending in a  radius from the Methodist church. Zukster was dissolved as a municipality in 1995.

References

Unincorporated communities in Randolph County, Georgia